Different cultures used different traditional numeral systems for naming large numbers. The extent of large numbers used varied in each culture. Two interesting points in using large numbers are the confusion on the term billion and milliard in many countries, and the use of zillion to denote a very large number where precision is not required.

Ancient India

The Shukla Yajurveda has a list of names for powers of ten up to 1012.
The list given in the Yajurveda text is: 
eka (1), daśa (10), śata (100), sahasra (1,000), ayuta (10,000), niyuta (100,000), prayuta (1,000,000), arbuda (10,000,000), nyarbuda (100,000,000), samudra (1,000,000,000), madhya (10,000,000,000), anta (100,000,000,000), parârdha (1,000,000,000,000). 
Later Hindu and Buddhist texts have extended this list,  but these lists are no longer mutually consistent and names of numbers larger than 108 differ between texts.

For example, the Pañcaviṁśa Brâhmaṇa 109 nikharva, 1010 vâdava, 1011 akṣiti, while   Śâṅkhyâyana Śrauta Sûtra has 109 nikharva, 1010 samudra, 1011 salila, 1012  antya, 1013 ananta.  Such lists of names for powers of ten are called daśaguṇottarra saṁjñâ. There area also analogous lists of Sanskrit names for fractional numbers, that is, powers of one tenth.

The Mahayana  Lalitavistara Sutra is notable for giving a very extensive such list, with terms going up to 10421. The context is an account of a contest including writing, arithmetic, wrestling and archery, in which the Buddha was pitted against the great mathematician Arjuna and showed off his numerical skills by citing the names of the powers of ten up to 1 'tallakshana', which equals 1053, but then going on to explain that this is just one of a series of counting systems that can be expanded geometrically.

Examples for other names given in the Avatamsaka Sutra include: asaṃkhyeya (असंख्येय)  10140.

In modern India, the terms lakh for 105 and crore for 107 are in common use. 
Both are vernacular (Hindustani) forms derived from a list of names for powers of ten in Yājñavalkya Smṛti, where 105 and 107 named lakṣa and koṭi, respectively.

Classical antiquity
In the Western world, specific number names for larger numbers did not come into common use until quite recently. The Ancient Greeks used a system based on the myriad, that is, ten thousand, and their largest named number was a myriad myriad, or one hundred million.

In The Sand Reckoner, Archimedes (c. 287–212 BC) devised a system of naming large numbers reaching up to 

,

essentially by naming powers of a myriad myriad. This largest number appears because it equals a myriad myriad to the myriad myriadth power, all taken to the myriad myriadth power. This gives a good indication of the notational difficulties encountered by Archimedes, and one can propose that he stopped at this number because he did not devise any new ordinal numbers (larger than 'myriad myriadth') to match his new cardinal numbers. Archimedes only used his system up to 1064. 

Archimedes' goal was presumably to name large powers of 10 in order to give rough estimates, but shortly thereafter, Apollonius of Perga invented a more practical system of naming large numbers which were not powers of 10, based on naming powers of a myriad, for example,  would be a myriad squared. 

Much later, but still in antiquity, the Hellenistic mathematician Diophantus (3rd century) used a similar notation to represent large numbers.

The Romans, who were less interested in theoretical issues, expressed 1,000,000 as decies centena milia, that is, 'ten hundred thousand';  it was only in the 13th century that the (originally French) word 'million' was introduced .

Medieval India

The  Indians, who invented the positional numeral system, along with negative numbers and zero, were quite advanced in this aspect. By the 7th century, Indian mathematicians were familiar enough with the notion of infinity as to define it as the quantity whose denominator is zero.

Modern use of large finite numbers
Far larger finite numbers than any of these occur in modern mathematics. For instance, Graham's number is too large to reasonably express using exponentiation or even tetration. For more about modern usage for large numbers, see Large numbers. To handle these numbers, new notations are created and used. There is a large community of mathematicians dedicated to naming large numbers. Currently, the largest number named by a professional mathematician is Rayo's number, and the largest (well-defined) number named by any mathematicians is Large Number Garden Number.

Infinity 

The ultimate in large numbers was, until recently, the concept of infinity, a number defined by being greater than any finite number, and used in the mathematical theory of limits.

However, since the 19th century, mathematicians have studied transfinite numbers, numbers which are not only greater than any finite number, but also, from the viewpoint of set theory, larger than the traditional concept of infinity. Of these transfinite numbers, perhaps the most extraordinary, and arguably, if they exist, "largest", are the large cardinals. The concept of transfinite numbers, however, was first considered by Indian Jaina mathematicians as far back as 400 BC.

References